Chris Wareing is an English professional wrestler, better known by his ring name Chris Ridgeway. He is a former PROGRESS World Champion and one-half of the GHC Junior Heavyweight Tag Team Championship with Yoshinari Ogawa. He currently works as a freelancer for promotions such as Westside Xtreme Wrestling (wXw), Pro Wrestling Noah, and Progress Wrestling.

Professional wrestling career

Independent circuit (2014–present)
Wareing participated at ICW Why Aye Man!, an event produced by Insane Championship Wrestling on April 2, 2016, where he suffered a loss against Kenny Williams. He took part in the wXw 16 Carat Gold 2020 Tournament, where he fell short to Mike Bailey in a first-round match from March 6, 2020. Wareing worked in a match for International Pro Wrestling: United Kingdom, at IPW Undisputed II on December 23, 2018, where he unsuccessfully challenged Kip Sabian for the IPW:UK World Championship. He also competed in the defunct Defiant Wrestling promotion where he faced the champion Walter and El Phantasmo in a three-way match for the Defiant Internet Championship on December 3, 2018 at Defiant Loaded #1.

Progress Wrestling (2017–present)
Wareing is known for his tenure with Progress Wrestling. At PROGRESS Chapter 74: Mid Week Matters on July 25, 2018, he faced Mark Haskins, Eddie Dennis and Pete Dunne in a four-way match, falling short to the latter. He competed in a reverse battle royal at PROGRESS Chapter 100: Unboxing Live IV - A New Hope on December 30, 2019 against the winner Chief Deputy Dunne, Travis Banks, El Ligero, Los Federales Santos Jr. and others. At the Super Strong Style 16 Tournament Edition 2019 held at PPOGRESS Chapter 88, Wareing scored a loss to Kyle O'Reilly on the first night from May 4. On the second night, teamed up with Darby Allin and Lucky Kid, defeating  Chris Brookes, DJ Z and Artemis Spencer in a six-man tag team match. He competed against Paul Robinson at PROGRESS Chapter 99: With A Flake, Please in a knockout of submission match for the Progress Proteus Championship, where he lost by referee decision.  He defeated Gene Munny, Omari and Spike Trivet in a four-way match at PROGRESS Chapter 104: Natural Progression on February 20, 2021, to become the number one contender for the Progress Unified World Championship. He competed at PROGRESS Chapter 105: Bring The Thunder, on Febauray 27, 2021, where he fell short to Cara Noir in a match for the Progress Unified World Championship. At PROGRESS Chapter 106: Stick A Pony In Me Pocket on March 13, 2021, Ridgeway teamed up with Ethan Allen in a losing effort to Lykos Gym (Kid Lykos & Kid Lykos II). At Super Strong Style 16, Ridgeway won the Super Strong Style 16 tournament and the vacant Progress Wrestling Unified World Championship.

Pro Wrestling Noah (2019–2020)
Wareing worked in several events for Pro Wrestling Noah, first of them being at the NOAH Global Junior Tag League 2019, where in the first night of the event from May 28, he teamed up with Hitoshi Kumano to defeat Hajime Ohara and Nosawa Rongai. On the second night og May 30, they fell short to Kotaro Suzuki and Yoshinari Ogawa, and on the third night of May 31, they defeated Junta Miyawaki and Seiya Morohashi. After getting eliminated from the tournament, Wareing participated in a eight-man tag team match which took place on the seventh night of the event, where he teamed up with Hitoshi Kumano, Katsuhiko Nakajima and Shuhei Taniguchi in a losing effort to Atsushi Kotoge, Masa Kitamiya, Kenoh and Yoshiki Inamura. Wareing participated in the NOAH Global Junior League 2019 where he placed himself in the Block B of the tournament and competed against superstars such as the later winner Hayata, Kotaro Suzuki and Hi69. On July 15, after finishing the block matches, he teamed up with Kaito Kiyomiya and Shuhei Taniguchi to defeat the team of AXIZ (Go Shiozaki, Katsuhiko Nakajima) and Naomichi Marufuji in a six-man tag team match. In the Junior League of 2020, he placed himself in the D Block where he competed against Daisuke Harada, Minoru Tanaka and Nio, finishing with only two points. Wareing unsuccessfully challenged Hayata for the GHC Junior Heavyweight Championship at NOAH Starting Over 2019 on December 3, 2019. He also competed for the IPW:UK Junior Heavyweight Championship at NOAH N-1 Victory 2019 on the sixth night of the event from August 25, where he fell short to Daisuke Harada.

Revolution Pro Wrestling (2017–present)
On the first night of the RevPro British J Cup 2018, an event promoted by Revolution Pro Wrestling from September 8, Wareing fell short to Kushida in a first round match. On the second night from September 9, he teamed up with CCK's Chris Brookes and Jonathan Gresham to defeat Dean Allmark, Ryusuke Taguchi and Tiger Mask IV in six-man tag team match action.

Championships and accomplishments
Fight! Nation Wrestling
FNW British Championship (1 time)
FutureShock Wrestling
FSW Tag Team Championship (1 time) - with T-Bone
Pro Wrestling Illustrated
Ranked No. 328 of the top 500 singles wrestlers in the PWI 500 in 2021
Pro Wrestling Noah
GHC Junior Heavyweight Tag Team Championship (1 time) – with Yoshinari Ogawa
Progress Wrestling
PROGRESS World Championship (1 time)
Super Strong Style 16 Tournament (2022)
Shropshire Wrestling Alliance
SWA Championship (1 time)
The Wrestling League
WLGP Championship (1 time)
TNT Extreme Wrestling
TNT Extreme Division Championship (1 time)

References

External links 
 
 
 

1993 births
English male professional wrestlers
Living people
Sportspeople from Liverpool
21st-century professional wrestlers
GHC Junior Heavyweight Tag Team Champions
PROGRESS World Champions